Valuation may refer to:

Economics
Valuation (finance), the determination of the economic value of an asset or liability
Real estate appraisal, sometimes called property valuation (especially in British English), the appraisal of land or buildings
A distinction between real prices and ideal prices in Marxist theory.
The term valuation function is often used as a synonym to utility function.
The sociology of valuation also takes economic valuation practices as an object of study.
 Valuation: Measuring and Managing the Value of Companies

Mathematics
Valuation (algebra), a measure of multiplicity
p-adic valuation, a special case
Valuation (geometry), a generalization of finitely-additive measures
Valuation (logic), an operation on well-formed formulas with the semantics of evaluation
Valuation (measure theory), a tool for constructing outer measures

Other uses
Valuation (ethics), the determination of the ethic or philosophic value of an object
 For personal valuation, see dignity